Lynn Terence Greer Jr. (born October 23, 1979) is an American former professional basketball player. He played at the point guard and shooting guard positions. He was an All-EuroLeague Second Team selection in 2004.

High school
Lynn attended Carver High School, in Philadelphia, Pennsylvania, where he played basketball.

College career 
Greer attended Temple University, where he played college basketball for John Chaney's Owls. In his senior year, he averaged 39.7 minutes per game, and also led the Owls with 23.2 points per game, including a career high 47 points, in a 70–67 OT victory against Wisconsin. He led the Owls to the Elite Eight in 2001, where they lost a tightly contested game to #1 seed Michigan State. Greer is Temple's second-all-time-leading scorer.

Professional career 
Prior to his NBA career, Greer played professionally in the Italian League, the Russian Super League, the Polish League, and the Greek League, and also with the then-named NBA D-League's Greenville Groove. In July 2006, he was signed to a multi-year contract by the NBA's Milwaukee Bucks, a team he played with in the pre-season of 2003.

Due to his limited role with the Bucks, he decided to sign a two-year deal with Olympiacos Piraeus on September 24, 2007. In the Greek League 2007–08 regular season, he averaged 12.4 points per game, in 24.1 minutes per game. In the 2007–08 Greek League post season, he played in 12 games, where he averaged 14.9 points per game, in 30.3 minutes per game, while also dishing out 2.7 assists per game. Finally, in 19 games in the Euroleague 2007–08 season, he averaged 16.3 points per game and 3.6 assists per game. In 2009, he transferred to Fenerbahçe Ülker. In January 2011, he joined Armani Jeans Milano. On October 4, 2011, he signed with UNICS Kazan. On August 16, 2012, he joined BC Azovmash in Ukraine. In August 2013, he signed with Darüşşafaka.

On June 25, 2015, Greer announced his retirement from professional basketball.

Personal life 
Greer is the son of Lynn Greer Sr., who was drafted by the Phoenix Suns in the 11th round (170th overall) of the 1973 NBA draft, and Alma Greer. Greer grew up in Southwest Philadelphia, and played against many NBA players, including Kobe Bryant, Jameer Nelson, Ronald "Flip" Murray, Rasheed Wallace, Richard "Rip" Hamilton, Malik Rose, Malik Allen, and Cuttino Mobley.

Greer's son, Lynn Greer III, was a four-star recruit at IMG Academy  in Florida. He committed to play basketball for the Dayton Flyers on February 15, 2021. However he transferred to Saint Joseph's in January 2022.

References and notes

External links 
 Lynn Greer NBA.com Profile
 Euroleague.net Profile
 Eurobasket.com Profile
 Italian League Profile 
 
 TBLStat.net Profile

1979 births
Living people
African-American basketball players
American expatriate basketball people in Greece
American expatriate basketball people in Italy
American expatriate basketball people in Poland
American expatriate basketball people in Russia
American expatriate basketball people in Turkey
American expatriate basketball people in Ukraine
American men's basketball players
Basket Napoli players
BC Azovmash players
BC Dynamo Moscow players
BC UNICS players
Darüşşafaka Basketbol players
Fenerbahçe men's basketball players
Greek Basket League players
Greenville Groove players
Harlem Globetrotters players
Lega Basket Serie A players
Milwaukee Bucks players
Near East B.C. players
Olimpia Milano players
Olympiacos B.C. players
Point guards
Shooting guards
Śląsk Wrocław basketball players
Temple Owls men's basketball players
Undrafted National Basketball Association players
Universiade medalists in basketball
Universiade bronze medalists for the United States
Medalists at the 2001 Summer Universiade
Basketball players from Philadelphia
United States men's national basketball team players
21st-century African-American sportspeople
20th-century African-American sportspeople